Kristinehamn railway station is a railway station in Kristinehamn, Sweden.

The station opened in 1866.

See also 
 Rail transport in Sweden

References

Railway stations in Värmland County
1866 establishments in Sweden
Kristinehamn